The South Kesteven District Council elections were held in South Kesteven in 1983.

Results

Deeping St James Ward

Market and West Deeping Ward

References

1983
South Kesteven
1980s in Lincolnshire